The Macedon Football & Netball Club, nicknamed the Cats, is an Australian Rules Football club and Netball Club located 61 km north west of Melbourne  in the  town of Macedon and affiliated with the Riddell District Football League.

Premierships (4)
Riddell District Football League
1975, 2017
Woodend District Football League
1919
Gisborne District Football League
1907

AFL players

Daniel Markworth - 
Lachie Plowman - , 
Matthew Dick - ,

References

Books
History of Football in the Bendigo District - John Stoward - 

Macedon Football Club
1887 establishments in Australia
Sports clubs established in 1887
Shire of Macedon Ranges